Panpur is an outgrowth  of Bhatpara in Barrackpore I CD Block in Barrackpore subdivision of North 24 Parganas district in the state of West Bengal, India. Panpur-Keutia is a gram panchayat. It is a part of Kolkata Urban Agglomeration.

Geography

Location
96% of the population of Barrackpore subdivision (partly presented in the map alongside) live in urban areas. In 2011, it had a density of population of 10,967 per km2 The subdivision has 16 municipalities and 24 census towns.

For most of the cities/ towns information regarding density of population is available in the Infobox. Population data is not available for neighbourhoods. It is available for the entire municipal area and thereafter ward-wise.

All places marked on the map are linked in the full-screen map.

Police station
Naihati police station under Barrackpore Police Commissionerate has jurisdiction over Naihati municipal area and Barrackpore I CD Block, including Barrackpur Cantonment Board.

CD Block HQ
The headquarters of Barrackpore I CD Block is at Panpur.

Demographics

Population
As per the 2011 Census of India, Panpur had a total population of 2,257, of which 1,123 (50%) were males and 1,134 (50%) were females. Population below 6 years was 179. The total number of literates in Panpur was 1,908 (91.82% of the population over 6 years).

Kolkata Urban Agglomeration
The following Municipalities, Census Towns and other locations in Barrackpore subdivision were part of Kolkata Urban Agglomeration in the 2011 census: Kanchrapara (M), Jetia (CT), Halisahar (M), Balibhara (CT), Naihati (M), Bhatpara (M), Kaugachhi (CT), Garshyamnagar (CT), Garulia (M), Ichhapur Defence Estate (CT), North Barrackpur (M), Barrackpur Cantonment (CB), Barrackpore (M), Jafarpur (CT), Ruiya (CT), Titagarh (M), Khardaha (M), Bandipur (CT), Panihati (M), Muragachha (CT) New Barrackpore (M), Chandpur (CT), Talbandha (CT), Patulia (CT), Kamarhati (M), Baranagar (M), South Dumdum (M), North Dumdum (M), Dum Dum (M), Noapara (CT), Babanpur (CT), Teghari (CT), Nanna (OG), Chakla (OG), Srotribati (OG) and Panpur (OG).

Transport
Panpur is beside Kalyani Expressway.

Kankinara railway station on the Sealdah-Ranaghat line is located nearby.

References

Cities and towns in North 24 Parganas district